"Candyman Messiah" is a song by Army of Lovers and released as a single in 1991. This song is written by Alexander Bard, Anders Wollbeck, Camilla Henemark and Jean-Pierre Barda. It peaked at number 22 in Sweden and number 10 in Finland. Although La Camilla sang vocals, Michaela de la Cour was featured in the video.

Single track listing
7" single
"Candyman Messiah" - 3:08
"Candyman Messiah" (Dub Version) - 4:45

12" maxi-single
"Candyman Messiah" (Stalingrad Mix) - 5:36
"Candyman Messiah" (Radio Edit) - 3:08
"Candyman Messiah" (Tolstoy Farm Mix) - 5:35
"Candyman Messiah" (Orthodoxicated Mix) - 4:45

Charts

References 

1991 songs
1991 singles
Army of Lovers songs
English-language Swedish songs
Songs written by Alexander Bard
Songs written by Anders Wollbeck